Daniil Vladimirovich Shabalin (born 3 January 1998) is a Russian professional football player. He plays as a centre-back for Spartak Kostroma.

Club career
He made his Russian Football National League debut for FC Baltika Kaliningrad on 4 August 2018 in a game against FC Luch Vladivostok.

References

External links
 Profile by FNL

1998 births
People from Kaliningrad
Living people
Russian footballers
Association football defenders
FC Baltika Kaliningrad players
FC Spartak Kostroma players
Russian First League players
Russian Second League players